= Plax =

Coordinates: 41.3303°N 71.9065°W

Plax is the name of a manufacturing factory that was located in Stonington, Connecticut. It began operations in Stonington in 1957, and was later purchased by the Monsanto Chemical Company. It specialized in the manufacturing of plastic bottles. The General Manager was Benedict U. Feole, formerly of New Britain, Connecticut and Westerly, Rhode Island.

== History ==
The building that housed 'Plax' has gone through many incarnations. It was built by John F. Trumbull in 1851. It was then leased and used to make horseshoe nails and, later, trinkets from the South Sea trade. It eventually housed the Josly Fire Arms Company and made 16,500 breech-loading carbines, used mainly by the Union cavalry during the Civil War. It was closed soon after the war and subsequently had several short term tenants.

In 1876, the Atwood Machine Company took occupancy.

The building was leased by 'Plax', although the dates of occupancy are unclear. 'Plax' was purchased by the Monsanto Company and eventually moved its operations from Stonington, Connecticut to St. Louis, Missouri. In the Hartford Courant, on November 11, 1963, an article was published stating that "...Monsanto Chemical Company Friday admitted a Connecticut division of its giant production operation -- the Plax Company at Stonington -- may undergo some changes."

There is a picture of 'Plax' when it was owned by The Monsanto Company, dated 1957. It can be found in the University Archives, Special Collections, of The Washington University Library in St. Louis, Missouri. This archive houses documents and pictures owned by Monsanto from 1901 to 2006. (See the second outside link, below.)

This historic building was consumed by a fire on July 3, 2003, although the walls still remain standing.

While the foregoing describes the manufacturing end of Plax, there was more to it than that. A Research & Development group was based in Bloomfield, Connecticut. The group developed plastics blow-molding equipment which it installed in its own manufacturing facilities and also licensed to other companies on an international basis. In the basement of the Bloomfield building it tested the machinery that it developed. The company held several patents for this type of machinery, which are listed below. The company began as an offshoot of the Emhart Corporation in the 1950s.

US Patent 2,864,124: Plastics Blow Molding Apparatus. Robert G. Strauss, assignor to Plax Corporation, September 5, 1957

US Patent 2,804,648: Plastics Blow Molding Apparatus. Robert G. Strauss, assignor to Plax Corporation, September 3, 1957

US Patent 3,420,926: Method for Selectively Controlling the Extrusion of Plastics Materials. Robert G. Strauss, assignor to Plax Corporation, January 7, 1969
